Franklin Forge is a census-designated place (CDP) in Blair County, Pennsylvania, United States. It was first listed as a CDP prior to the 2020 census.

The CDP is in eastern Blair County, in the northwestern part of Woodbury Township. It is bordered to the northwest by Piney Creek, just upstream from the creek's confluence with the Frankstown Branch Juniata River at Ganister. Wertz Road forms the northern boundary of the CDP, and Krajacic Lane is the western boundary.

Demographics

References 

Census-designated places in Blair County, Pennsylvania
Census-designated places in Pennsylvania